Agence France-Presse (AFP) is a French international news agency headquartered in Paris, France. Founded in 1835 as Havas, it is the world's oldest news agency.

AFP has regional headquarters in Nicosia, Montevideo, Hong Kong and Washington, D.C., and news bureaus in 151 countries in 201 locations. AFP transmits stories, videos, photos and graphics in French, English, Arabic, Portuguese, Spanish, and German.

History

Agence France-Presse has its origins in the Agence Havas, founded in 1835 in Paris by Charles-Louis Havas, making it the world's oldest news service. The agency pioneered the collection and dissemination of news as a commodity, and had established itself as a fully global concern by the late 19th century. Two Havas employees, Paul Julius Reuter and Bernhard Wolff, set up their own news agencies in London and Berlin respectively.

In 1940, when German forces occupied France during World War II, the news agency was taken over by the authorities and renamed "Office français d'information" (French Information Office); only the private advertising company retained the name Havas. On 20 August 1944, as Allied forces moved on Paris, a group of journalists in the French Resistance seized the offices of the FIO and issued the first news dispatch from the liberated city under the name of Agence France-Presse.

Established as a state enterprise, AFP devoted the post-war years to developing its network of international correspondents. One of them was the first Western journalist to report the death of the Soviet leader Joseph Stalin on 6 March 1953.
AFP was keen to shake off its semi-official status, and on 10 January 1957, the French Parliament passed a law establishing its independence. Since that date, the proportion of the agency's revenues generated by subscriptions from government departments has steadily declined. Such subscriptions represented 115 million euros in 2011.

In 1982, the agency began to decentralize its editorial decision-making by setting up the first of its five autonomous regional centres, in Hong Kong, then a British dependent territory. Each region has its own budget, administrative director and chief editor. In September 2007, the AFP Foundation was launched to promote higher standards of journalism worldwide.

The Mitrokhin Archive identified six agents and two confidential KGB contacts inside Agence France-Presse who were used in Soviet operations in France.

In 1991, AFP set up a joint venture with Extel to create a financial news service, AFX News. It was sold in 2006 to Thomson Financial.

In October 2008, the Government of France announced moves to change AFP's status, including the involvement of outside investors. On 27 November of that year, the main trade unions represented in the company's home base of France – the CGT, Force Ouvrière, Syndicat national des journalistes, Union syndicale des journalistes CFDT and 
SUD, launched an online petition to oppose what they saw as an attempt to privatise the agency.

On 10 December 2009, the French Culture Minister Frédéric Mitterrand announced that he was setting up a Committee of Experts under former AFP CEO Henri Pigeat to study plans for the agency's future status. On February 24, 2010, Pierre Louette unexpectedly announced his intention to resign as CEO by the end of March, and move to a job with France Télécom.

In November 2013, AFP and Getty Images were ordered to pay $1.2 million compensation to freelance photojournalist Daniel Morel for using his images posted on Twitter related to the 2010 Haiti earthquake without his permission, in violation of copyright and Twitter's terms of service.

AFP's statute was changed in 2015 to bring it into line with European legislation through Law No. 2015-433 of 17 April 2015. The State's financing of AFP was thus modified and was structured into two components: 
 Financial compensation for the Agency’s missions of general interest
 Commercial subscriptions from the State

The current CEO and chairman is Fabrice Fries and the Global News Director is Phil Chetwynd.

Prizes and awards 
In 1983, the Albert Londres Prize was awarded to Patrick Meney, who wrote a series of articles about 600 French people forcibly detained in the Gulag after World War II. In 1984, his book Les Mains coupées de la Taïga was published.

In 1988, Sammy Ketz received the next Albert Londres Prize. Together with his colleague from the liberation movement, Serge Chalandon, he covered the events of the Libyan Civil War for 6 years.

On October 17, 2014, AFP international director Michèle Léridon received the Investigation and Reporting Award at the International Congress of Journalism and Information. Michèle Léridon sat the author of the article "Covering ISIS", which was posted on the agency's blog.

In December 2014, Bülent Kiliç was named Time magazine Photojournalist of the Year for his coverage of events in the Middle East and Europe. The photographer received the same acknowledgement from The Guardian newspaper.

AFP projects 
AFP Graphics

In 1988, the agency has its own department of infographics - AFP Graphics, which today creates about 70 graphics per day. According to the information provided by the agency's website, thematically infographics have the following distribution: 31% - politics, 27% - economics, 18% - sports, 12% - society, 10% - general news, 2% - culture and media. Infographics are available in 6 languages: French, English, Arabic, Portuguese, Spanish and German.

AFP Forum

In 2014, AFP launches a content platform that is available on all electronic media: computers, tablets and mobile phones. AFP Forum is divided into several sections, including homepage, text materials, photos, videos and graphics. News can be filtered by headings (news, business, sports, science), hashtags and by geographical regions (Africa, North America, Europe, etc.). All information is available in 6 languages: French, English, Arabic, Portuguese, Spanish, German, Traditional and Simplified Chinese. In total, there are about 1250 illustrated materials per day, available in XML, HTML, TXT, NewsML or WML formats.

AFP Video services

In July 2001, the agency announced the launch of AFP Video services, a video graphics division. Already in 2007, the agency launches AFPTV - a project in which all news from 2011 appear in HD video format. As of 2015, 200 videos in 7 different languages appear on the site every day.

Mobile services

In 2008, Mobile services appeared - a separate digital platform for mobile phones. News in Mobile services is available in 6 languages (French, English, Arabic, Portuguese, Spanish, German) and is divided into 22 thematic blocks: world news, world sports, football, top pages, Middle East, US news, Asia and Pacific news region, photos, videos, UK news, Africa, business, sports in the US, South African news, science, cricket, US politics, culture, Canada, lifestyle, technology and media, more. In addition to the section by headings, the news is divided into 100 categories (crime, energy, military conflicts, human rights, etc.), 43 countries, 70 cities and 100 hashtags. There is also a general search.

Statutes
AFP operates under a 1957 law as a commercial business independent of the French government. AFP is administered by a CEO and a board comprising 15 members:
 Eight representatives of the French press;
 Two representatives of AFP personnel;
 Two representatives of Public Services radio and television;
 Three representatives of the government. One is named by the prime minister, another by the minister of finance, and a third by the minister of foreign affairs.

The mission of AFP is defined in its statute:
 Agence France-Presse may under no circumstances take account of influences or considerations liable to compromise the exactitude or the objectivity of the information it provides; it may under no circumstances fall under the control, either de facto or de jure, of any ideological, political or economic grouping;
 Agence France-Presse must, to the full extent that its resources permit, develop and enhance its organisation so as to provide French and foreign users with exact, impartial and trustworthy information on a regular and uninterrupted basis;
 Agence France-Presse must, to the full extent that its resources permit, ensure the existence of a network of facilities giving it the status of a worldwide information service.

The board elects the CEO for a renewable term of three years. AFP also has a council charged with ensuring that the agency operates according to its statutes, which mandate absolute independence and neutrality. Editorially, AFP is governed by a network of senior journalists.

The primary client of AFP is the French government, which purchases subscriptions for its various services. In practice, those subscriptions are an indirect subsidy to AFP. The statutes of the agency prohibit direct government subsidies.

Number of employees
Based in Paris, AFP covers 151 countries, with 201 offices, 50 local correspondents and five regional centres:

Washington (North America)
Hong Kong (Asia-Pacific)
Montevideo (Latin America)
Nicosia (Middle East)
Paris (Europe and Africa)

AFP says it employs 2,400 people of 100 different nationalities, including 1,700 journalists. It provides information in six languages (French, English, Spanish, German, Portuguese and Arabic), twenty-four hours a day.

Investments 
Notable investments include:
 thAFP GmbH
 AFP GmbH is the subsidiary of AFP in Germany, producing German-language services for local press, internet and corporate clients.
 SID
 Sport-Informations-Dienst (SID) is producing a German-language sports service.
 Citizenside
 In 2007, AFP  purchased a 34% stake in Scooplive, a citizen news photo and video agency online. Established in France in 2006, Scooplive was renamed Citizenside after this investment, but AFP soon sold its shares to news aggregator Newzulu.

See also
 List of news agencies

References

External links

  
 Citizenside website
 SOS-AFP trade union website

 
International organizations based in France
1835 establishments in France
Companies established in 1835
Mass media companies of France
Companies based in Paris
Mass media in Paris